Hollis Read (August 26, 1802 - April 7, 1887) was a missionary, lecturer, pastor, and author in the United States. He wrote about religion, India, and Africa as well as about emancipated African Americans after the American Civil War in the United States. He recommended expatriating African Americans to Africa in his influential book The Negro Problem Solved, Or, Africa as She Was, as She Is, and as She Shall Be: Her Curse and Her Cure published in 1864. It recommended sending freed slaves to Africa after the American Civil War.

Early life
He was born in Newfane, Vermont and studied at Williams College and Princeton Seminary.

Career
In 1833 he led a mission to Ahmednagar, India. He wrote an account of the trip:

I had been there but a few hours when the Chief Magistrate issued an order forbidding any person to take a book from me under penalty of a rupee and a quarter. Consequently, no applications were made during the first day; but about eleven o'clock at night, when all was still, a Brahman came to me secretly and begged a book. I gave him one. He was followed by others. They took whatever I gave them without uttering a word and went away. The next day the threat was unheeded, and the people received books and tracts both in the streets and at my lodgings, without the least fear or hesitation. The people said their rulers had no right to forbid their receiving religious books.

In 1838, he funded the pulpit for the First Presbyterian Church of Long Island. His sermon "The religion of common life" was published in 1856.

Selected works

References

1802 births
1887 deaths
Christian writers
India
Protestant
 Missionaries